Independence Township is an inactive township in Schuyler County, in the U.S. state of Missouri.

Independence Township was erected in 1843.

References

Townships in Missouri
Townships in Schuyler County, Missouri
1843 establishments in Missouri